Si Thu Lwin (also spelt Sithu Lwin; born 25 March 1973) is a Burmese pop singer and actor. He is considered one of the most successful Burmese singers and rose to fame with his debut album Chit Thu Myat Yet Nayt.

Early life and education
Si Thu Lwin was born on 25 March 1973 in Yangon, Myanmar. He is the only son of Ngwe Kyi, a cartoonist and his wife Daw Kywe. He graduated from Rangoon University with a degree in Math.

Career
Sithu entered the singing contest held by U Saw Nu in 1993 and won the contest together with Tin Zar Maw. After his win, he prepared for her debut album named "Chit Thu Myar Yet Nayt" (The Day of Lovers). The album was released in 1995. Sithu has starred the leading role in the film named Nhote Kham Htet Ka Dar Thwar.
 
Sithu performed his first one-man show concert in 2014. Si Thu and Tin Zar Maw performed together in a live duet concert called "Beyond the 21st Duet Live" on 27 August 2016 at the Myanmar Convention Centre, where a huge crowd of thousands fans were celebrated.

On 10 November 2018, he embarked on his one-man solo concert called  "A Part Of Me"  at the Hexagon Complex, Shwe Htut Tin, Yangon.

Discography

Solo albums
Chit Thu Myar Yet Nayt
A Linn Let Sone
Ah Kaung Sone Tay Myar
Lu Hnint Diary
Nway Oo Kabyar
Nya A Pyin Sar

Personal life
Si Thu Lwin is married to Nwe Mar Kyaw in December 2010. They have one son.

References

1973 births
Living people
Burmese singer-songwriters
21st-century Burmese male singers
People from Yangon